Chunta Qullu (Aymara chunta prolonged, lengthened, qullu mountain, "prolonged mountain", also spelled Chunta Kkollu) is a mountain in the Andes of Bolivia, about  high. It is situated in the La Paz Department, Larecaja Province, Sorata Municipality, north of the Cordillera Real. Chunta Chullu lies southeast of the mountain Ch'uch'u and northwest of the mountain Llawi Imaña.

See also 
 Ch'uch'u Jawira
 Wila Wilani

References 

Mountains of La Paz Department (Bolivia)